The 1936 Copa Aldao was the final match to decide the winner of the Copa Aldao, the 9th. edition of the international competition organised by the Argentine and Uruguayan Associations together. The final was contested by Uruguayan club Peñarol and Argentine club River Plate.

River Plate contested the match as the winner of "Copa de Oro", a cup that decided which team would participate in the final so the 1936 Argentine Primera División season had crowned two champions, River Plate and San Lorenzo. After River beat San Lorenzo 3–1, the team was eligible to play the 1936 edition of Copa Aldao.

The match was played at Estadio Centenario in Montevideo, where River Plate achieved a conclusive victory of 5–1 over Peñarol, winning its first Copa Aldao Trophy.

Qualified teams

Match details

Notes

References

1937 in Argentine football
1937 in Uruguayan football
Peñarol matches
Club Atlético River Plate matches
Football in Montevideo